Exit cost may refer to:
 Barriers to exit
 Exit fee, for example:
 exit fee in rental contracts
 Exit tax (disambiguation):
 Expatriation tax or emigration tax, a tax on persons who cease to be tax resident in a country
 Departure tax, a fee charged (under various names) by a country when a person is leaving the country
 Corporate exit tax, a tax on corporations who leave the country or transfer (virtual) assets to another country
 Transaction cost